Phacelia cookei is a rare species of phacelia known by the common name Cooke's phacelia. It is endemic to Siskiyou County, California, where it is known from just a few occurrences in the forest and scrub around Mount Shasta. The substrate in the area is sandy, ashy volcanic soil.

It is an annual herb growing in a small, flat mat or with a short upright stem a few centimeters high. It is blue-green in color, succulent, and lightly hairy. The oval, smooth-edged leaves are one or two centimeters long and borne on short petioles. The hairy inflorescence is a one-sided curving or coiling cyme of several tiny bell-shaped flowers. Each flower is white with lavender veining, about half a millimeter wide and no more than 2 millimeters long.

Further reading
Constance, L. & L. R. Heckard. (1970). Two new species of Phacelia (Hydrophyllaceae) from California. Brittonia 22:1 25–30.

External links
Jepson Manual Treatment
Photo gallery

cookei
Endemic flora of California
Mount Shasta
Natural history of Siskiyou County, California
Critically endangered flora of California
Plants described in 1970
Taxa named by Lincoln Constance